Kusova or Kusov Island (Ostrov Kusova) is a small island in the Shantar Islands in the Sea of Okhotsk. It lies southeast of Bolshoy Shantar Island.

Geography
The island lies towards the eastern end of the group. It is 4.2 km (2.6 mi) in length, with a maximum width of 2.6 km (1.6 mi). It is quite high, rising abruptly to a height of 633 m (2,076 ft).

Kusova Island is separated from Bolshoy Shantar Island to the northwest by a 14 km (8.7 mi) wide sound.

History

Kusova was frequented by American whaleships targeting bowhead whales between 1853 and 1867. They simply called it Round Island. They would anchor off the island and send men ashore to obtain wood.

References

Shantar Islands